Pentalobus kaupi is a beetle species of the genus Pentalobus of the family Passalidae. It occurs in São Tomé and Príncipe. The species was described in 2005.

References

Passalidae
Beetles of Africa
Beetles described in 2005
Insects of São Tomé and Príncipe